is a Japanese football player currently playing for Vegalta Sendai.

Club career stats
Updated to 28 October 2022.

Honours 
Individual

 Emperor's Cup Top Scorer: 2019
 Japan Professional Football Association Award: J2 Best XI (2022)

References

External links
Profile at Vegalta Sendai
Profile at Montedio Yamagata
Profile at Renofa Yamaguchi

 
 

1992 births
Living people
Osaka Sangyo University alumni
Association football people from Hyōgo Prefecture
Japanese footballers
J1 League players
J2 League players
J3 League players
Gainare Tottori players
Renofa Yamaguchi FC players
Montedio Yamagata players
Júbilo Iwata players
Mito HollyHock players
Vegalta Sendai players
Association football forwards